Rodrigo Alejandro Soto Zuñiga (born 30 October 1980) was a Chilean footballer. His last club was Magallanes.

References
 
 

1980 births
Living people
Chilean footballers
Coquimbo Unido footballers
Unión San Felipe footballers
Curicó Unido footballers
San Marcos de Arica footballers
San Luis de Quillota footballers
Magallanes footballers
Chilean Primera División players
Primera B de Chile players
Association football forwards
Footballers from Santiago